The 1996 World Juniors Track Cycling Championships were the 22nd annual Junior World Championships for track cycling held in Novo Mesto, Slovenia in August 1996.

The Championships had five events for men (Sprint, Points race, Individual pursuit, Team pursuit and 1 kilometre time trial) and two for women (Individual pursuit and Sprint).

Events

Medal table

References

UCI Juniors Track World Championships
1996 in track cycling
1996 in Slovenian sport